Barbodes dorsimaculatus, the blackline barb, is a species of cyprinid fish endemic to Sumatra.  This species can reach a length of  TL.  It can also be found in the aquarium trade.

References 

Barbodes
Cyprinid fish of Asia
Freshwater fish of Indonesia
Fish described in 1923